Army Brats is a 1984 Dutch comedy film directed by Ruud van Hemert. The film is a dark family comedy, guerrilla warfare between disturbed parents (Peter Faber and Geert de Jong) and their disruptive children leads to chaos and mayhem. The film drew 1 million visitors, making it one of the most successful Dutch films ever. The film was selected as the Dutch entry for the Best Foreign Language Film at the 57th Academy Awards, but was not accepted as a nominee.

Cast
Peter Faber as John Gisberts
Geert de Jong as Danny Gisberts
Akkemay Elderenbos as Madelon Gisberts
Frank Schaafsma as Thijs Gisberts
Pepijn Somer as Jan–Julius Gisberts
Olivier Somer as Valentijn Gisberts
Rijk de Gooijer as Pete Stewart
Erik Koningsberger as Dennis
Arie van Riet as John Wyatt

See also
List of Dutch submissions for the Academy Award for Best Foreign Language Film
List of submissions to the 57th Academy Awards for Best Foreign Language Film

References

External links

1980s black comedy films
1984 directorial debut films
1984 comedy films
Dutch black comedy films
1980s Dutch-language films